Ghost House Pictures is an American film production company that was founded in 2002 by Robert Tapert and Sam Raimi, which usually co-produces films with Joe Drake and Nathan Kahane. The company produces horror films such as Don't Breathe, Evil Dead, Drag Me to Hell, The Grudge and 30 Days of Night.

Ghost House Pictures

Ghost House Underground

Television series

See also
Renaissance Pictures
Blumhouse Productions
Dark Castle Entertainment
Gold Circle Films
Platinum Dunes
Twisted Pictures

References

Film production companies of the United States
American companies established in 2002
2002 establishments in the United States
Sam Raimi